Gordon E. Slethaug is an American Canadian professor of English currently working at the University of Southern Denmark, Campus Kolding.  He was the head of the American Studies Programme at the University of Hong Kong. He worked also at the University of Waterloo at Waterloo, Ontario, Canada.

Books
 Teaching Abroad: International Education and the Cross-cultural Classroom. In Google Books.
 Beautiful Chaos: Chaos Theory and Metachaotics in Recent American Fiction. In Google Books.
 The Play of the Double in Postmodern American Fiction In Google Books.
 Understanding John Barth, (by Stan Fogel and Gordon Slethaug).

See also
 List of University of Waterloo people
 Intercultural Communication

References
 http://www.isbndb.com/d/person/slethaug_gordon.html
 http://www.it-vest.sdu.dk/nywebX/inc/show.php?full=1348

Year of birth missing (living people)
Living people
American academics of English literature